Sultan Bazaar is an old commercial market in Hyderabad,  Telangana, India. It lies between the commercial areas of Abids and Koti. It was previously known as the residency bazaar. Later it was named after the nawab of that area, Syed Sultanuddin, and so is known as sultan bazar now.

Commercial area
This area is a big shopping center mainly for women's clothes and silverware.

There are more than 100 shops here, selling textiles, fashion etc.

Transport
The state run TSRTC has a big bus terminal at close by koti to all parts of the city.

The closest MMTS Train Station is at Kachiguda or Malakpet.

The nearest metro station is Sultan Bazaar metro station

Schools and other features
There is a school called Cambridge High School in the area. The famous theatre Maheswari Parmeshwari theatre was also located here. There is a Jain temple located amidst the Sultan Bazar. A street in this area is famous for the sale of electronic goods and is called electronic market or bank street. A Sai Baba temple is in the Kanda Swamy lane. Shri Gujarati Vidya Mandir and Hanuman Vyayamshala schools are located in this locality.

See also

References

Bazaars in India
Bazaars in Hyderabad, India
Neighbourhoods in Hyderabad, India